HWD may refer to:

Places in California, United States 
Hayward Executive Airport (IATA code: HWD)
Hollywood, Los Angeles, a suburb

Other uses 
HWD Hospital Radio, serving West Yorkshire, England
 Heavy Weight Deflectometer, a model of pavement test device